Montbrook Army Air Field, was a World War II United States Army Air Forces airfield, located   south-southwest of Williston, Florida.

History
During World War II, the airfield was opened as a US Army Air Forces installation on 1 January 1942.  Montbrook was a sub-base of the Army Air Force School of Applied Tactics Alachua Army Air Field.  The airfield was very small with only a few personnel assigned.  It was under the operational control of the AAFSAT 415th Bombardment Group Medium Bombardment training unit at Alachua AAF.

Known units assigned at Montbrook AAF were:
 99th Bombardment Squadron, 5 February-14 November 1943 (B-25 Mitchell), (B-26 Marauder)
 465th Bombardment Squadron, 19 November 1943 – 2 March 1944 (DB-7, A-20 Havoc)

On 20 May 1944, the airfield was put on standby status and placed under the control of the 4318th Army Air Force Base Unit (Base Maintenance).   It appears to have been closed by the end of 1944 with jurisdiction of the airfield being transferred to Air Technical Service Command (ATSC), whose mission was the transfer of any useful military equipment to other bases around the country.  Under ATSC, buildings and equipment were sold and any useful military equipment was transferred to other bases around the country.  The base was declared as surplus and was turned over to the War Assets Administration (WAA) for disposal and return to civil use.

See also

 Florida World War II Army Airfields
 Army Air Force School of Applied Tactics

References

 Maurer, Maurer (1983). Air Force Combat Units Of World War II. Maxwell AFB, Alabama: Office of Air Force History. .
 
 Shaw, Frederick J. (2004), Locating Air Force Base Sites History’s Legacy, Air Force History and  Museums Program, United States Air Force, Washington DC, 2004.
 AFHRA search Montbrook Army Airfield
 World War II airfields database: Florida

Airfields of the United States Army Air Forces in Florida
Army Air Forces School of Applied Tactics Airfields
Military installations in Florida
1942 establishments in Florida
Military airbases established in 1942
1944 disestablishments in Florida
Military installations closed in 1944
Williston, Florida